Emilio Gómez Muriel was a prolific Mexican film director, active between the 1930s and the 1970s.

He is known for melodramas, but one of his first films was Redes (release: 1936), an attempt at social cinema with a mostly non-professional cast.

He won an award at the 1960 San Sebastian Film Festival for Simitrio.

Filmography
 While Mexico Sleeps (1938)
 The Unknown Policeman (1941)
 Another Dawn (1943)
 The Lieutenant Nun (1944)
 Nocturne of Love (1948)
 The Woman of the Port (1949)
 Engagement Ring (1951)
 A Galician Dances the Mambo (1951)
 Carne de presidio (1952)
 A Divorce (1953)
 The Three Elenas (1954)
 The Empty Star (1958)
 La cigüeña distraída (1966)
 La Cama (1968)
 La Buscona (1970)

More of his films are the subject of articles on Spanish Wikipedia.

References

External links
Emilio Gómez Muriel filmography IMDb

1985 deaths
Mexican film directors